Marcus Wallenberg (June 1774 – 22 September 1833) was a Swedish theologian who served as the Bishop of Linköping between 1819 and 1833.

Marcus Wallenberg was born in Linköping where his father, Marcus Wallenberg, was a vicar. His mother was Sara Helena Kinnander.

See also 

 Wallenberg family

References

External links 

 

1774 births
1833 deaths
Bishops of Linköping
Lutheran bishops of Linköping
Wallenberg family
People from Linköping